The Rural Municipality of Whiska Creek No. 106 is a rural municipality (RM) in the Canadian province of Saskatchewan within Census Division No. 3 and  Division No. 3. It is located in the southwest portion of the province.

History 
The RM of Whiska Creek No. 106 incorporated as a rural municipality on January 1, 1913.

Demographics 

Government 
The RM of Whiska Creek No. 106 is governed by an elected municipal council and an appointed administrator that meets on the second Monday of every month. The reeve of the RM is Kelly Williamson while its administrator is Teresa Richards. The RM's office is located in Vanguard.

Transportation 
Poverty Valley Aerodrome is located within the RM.

References 

Whiska Creek
 
Division No. 3, Saskatchewan